The economy of Bengaluru contributes over 43.65% to the economy of the State of Karnataka, accounting for 98% of the Software Exports of the State.

The establishment and success of high technology firms in Bangalore has led to the growth of Information Technology (IT) in India. As of 2020, IT firms in Bengaluru employ about 1.5 million employees in the IT and IT-enabled services (ITES)/BPM sectors, out of nearly 4.4 million employees across India and account for the highest IT-related exports in the country.  In 2014, Bangalore contributed US$ 45 billion, or 38% of India’s total IT exports.

The estimated Metro GDP (PPP) of the city is around US$110 billion, coupled with a Metro GDP (PPP) Per Capita of roughly US$25,461, and it has been ranked as the fourth most productive metro area of India.

One of the important factors spurring Bangalore's growth was heavy state government investment (and its environment) in Bangalore's public sector industries.

Education

Bangalore houses a number of top tier colleges including the Indian Institute of Management, Bangalore (IIMB), a top management Institute in India, the Indian Statistical Institute (ISI), the Indian Institute of Science (IISc), the Indian Institute of Astrophysics, the National Law School (NLSIU), The Indian Institute of Theoretical Sciences, National Institute of Design (NID), and National Institute of Fashion Technology (NIFT)..

Economic sectors

The earliest startups that were launched in the city in the 1990s include Infosys, Wipro Technologies, Mindtree being popular ones and smaller ones include Tejas Networks. Flipkart, having originated in Bangalore, acquired several other e-commerce companies originated in Bangalore like Myntra and was itself eventually acquired by Walmart in 2018 for close to $20 Billion. Startup companies such as Swiggy, Ola Cabs, InMobi, Quikr, RedBus are also based in the city.

Bangalore is a favorable destination for industrial developments. United Breweries Group is headquartered in Bangalore. The city is an automobile production hub. Tata Hitachi Construction Machinery, Mahindra Electric, Bharat Earth Movers, Toyota Kirloskar Motor, Tesla India, Ather Energy are headquartered in Bangalore within there operations. Robert Bosch GmbH, Mercedes-Benz, Volvo, General Motors, Royal Enfield, Honda Motorcycle and Scooter India, Scania AB, Larsen & Toubro have their plants and research & development (R&D) centers around Bangalore. ABB, General Electric, Tyco International have their research & development centers in Bangalore. Aerospace industries are also popular around Bangalore, which made it as Aviation Monopoly capital of India. Airbus, Boeing, Tata Advanced Systems, Indian Space Research Organisation, Liebherr Aerospace have there units in Bangalore. Bangalore has also emerged as an electronics & hardware manufacturing hub of India. It houses Dell, Nokia, Philips, Wistron manufacturing and R&D units. Public sector undertakings (PSUs) such as  Bharat Electronics Limited (BEL), Hindustan Aeronautics Limited (HAL), National Aerospace Laboratories (NAL), Bharat Earth Movers Limited (BEML), Central Manufacturing Technology Institute (CMTI), HMT (formerly Hindustan Machine Tools) and Rail Wheel Factory (RWF). SKF also has a plant in the city.

Information Technology 

Bangalore is firstly known for its IT industry. It houses many IT Companies. Here are many IT companies like Infosys, Mphasis, Wipro, Tata Consultancy Services, Nasdaq, Facebook, Google and Microsoft etc. India's two largest IT companies - Infosys and Wipro to name a few have their headquarters here in Bangalore. Electronic City is a place in Bangalore, which houses IT companies in Bangalore along with Infosys headquarters. Whitefield is another major suburb housing many IT companies. It is called as "The Silicon Valley of India' and "IT Capital of India"

Aerospace and aviation 

Bangalore is also called the aviation monopoly capital of India. It accounts for more than 65% of India's aerospace business. World Aerospace giants such as Boeing, Airbus, Goodrich, Dynamatics, Honeywell, GE Aviation, UTL, others have their Research & Development and Engineering centres in Bangalore.

Before Bangalore was called the Silicon Valley of India, the city made its name as headquarters to some of the largest public sector heavy industries of India. The Hindustan Aeronautics Limited (HAL) headquarters is in Bangalore, and is dedicated to research and development activities for indigenous fighter aircraft for the Indian Air Force. With over 9,500 employees, it is one of the largest public sector employers in Bangalore.

Today, HAL manufactures, under license, various fighter aircraft for the Indian Air Force (IAF) including Sukhoi 30 Flankers and Jaguars. HAL also develops indigenous products for the IAF such as HAL Tejas, Aeronautical Development Agency, HAL Dhruv and HAL HF-24 Marut.

The National Aerospace Laboratories (NAL) is also headquartered in Bangalore and is dedicated to the development of civil aviation technologies. Incorporated in 1960, NAL often works in conjunction with the HAL and has a staff strength of over 1,300 employees. NAL also investigates aircraft malfeasance.

A  special economic zone for the aerospace industry is being set up near the Kempegowda International Airport. Bangalore was also home to large domestic airlines - now defunct Simplifly Deccan and Kingfisher Airlines.

Biotechnology 

Biotechnology is a rapidly expanding field in the city. Bangalore accounts for at least 97 of the approximately 240 biotechnology companies in India. Interest in Bangalore as a base for biotechnology companies stems from Karnataka's comprehensive biotechnology policy, described by the Karnataka Vision Group on Biotechnology. In 2003–2004, Karnataka attracted the maximum venture capital funding for biotechnology in the country - $8 million. Biocon, headquartered in Bangalore, is the nation's leading biotechnology company and ranks 16th in the world in revenues.

Institute of Bioinformatics and Applied Biotechnology (IBAB), initiated by Biotechnology vision group, ICICI and Biocon (located at ITPL) is trying to shape revolutionary scientists in the field. 

Like the software industry which initially drew most of its workforce from the local public sector engineering industries, the biotechnology industry had access to talent from the National Center of Biological Sciences (NCBS) and the Indian Institute of Science (IISc).

Manufacturing 
Other heavy industries in Bangalore include Bharat Electronics Limited, Bharat Heavy Electricals Limited (BHEL), Indian Telephone Industries (ITI), Bharat Earth Movers Limited (BEML), HMT (formerly Hindustan Machine Tools), Hindustan Motors (HM) and ABB Group.

Bangalore is also becoming a destination for the automotive industry. Volvo and many other auto suppliers have manufacturing plants in Bangalore.

Bangalore houses many small and medium scale industries in its Peenya industrial area that claimed to be one of the biggest in Asia 30-years ago; newly including Apple's India manufacturing plant - the only active plant in the world outside of China.

Other sectors
Food: The city has several types of entrepreneurial pursuits that have shaped it along the way from the early '90s. The city is known for several restaurateurs who innovated on fast service models popularly called Darshini restaurants that served hot breakfast and beverages. Orkla foods, the Norwegian foods company bought MTR Foods, traditional ready-to-eat consumer goods brand in 2007 for approximately $60m. A recent $100m brand is ID foods, fast becoming popular in retail. Swiggy an on-demand food delivery Unicorn is popular along with Zomato, a restaurant review, listing and food delivery business, that initially started in Bangalore. FreshMenu is a near unicorn cloud kitchen business that only delivers via mobile apps and other on-demand food apps. Cafe Coffee Day, a listed entity is a coffee store chain with stores in Prague, Bratislava, Riga and Warsaw. Chai Point is a chain of tea stores founded in Bangalore in 2010.

Real Estate: Several Venture Capital funded startups like housing, nestaway, nobroker, commonfloor.com (acquired by the Unicorn, Quikr) are disrupting the rental marketplace in India. Several listed real estate brands have their origins in the city like Prestige Group, Brigade Enterprises, Total Environment and Sobha Developers.

Aerospace: India's largest indigenous OEM, Hindustan Aeronautics Limited (HAL) had its headquarters in India. Several smaller tier 1 and tier 2 suppliers had their base in the city to serve the OEM need. The National Aerospace Laboratories (NAL) is also headquartered in Bangalore and is dedicated to the development of civil aviation technologies. Bangalore also housed now-defunct full-service airline brand Kingfisher Airlines, which acquired another airline startup, Air Deccan, a budget airline.

Space: The Indian Space Research Organization (ISRO), one of the top national space agencies in the world is headquartered in the city. ISRO is recognized world over for its indigenous capabilities in launching low cost satellites using its own launch vehicles, the PSLV and the GSLVs. ISRO has a record of deploying 104 satellites in orbits successfully in a single launch, which is a world record. ISRO has also launched a Mars mission, Mars Orbital Mission, which was the lowest cost inter-planetary orbital mission. Startups have made attempts to launch lunar rovers and are analysing satellite images to uses in agriculture and climate.

Transportation: Bangalore is the home of India's first electric car brand, Reva was acquired by a large domestic car company, Mahindra & Mahindra. Several startups in automotive services, marketplaces are situated in the city. On-demand taxi service, Ola Cabs, a Unicorn, originated in the city and acquired its early competition and peer, taxiforsure. Bounce is an on-demand motorbike startup that originated in the city. Car rental companies operating in the city includes Avis, Carzonrent, Hype Luxury Mobility, Mylescars, Revvcar and Zoomcar.  Zoomcar is on demand inter city car transportation startup running out of the city. RedBus is an intercity bus aggregator that was bought by Naspers group.

Grocery: BigBasket.com, Zopnow.com and Zopper.com, started in on-demand grocery and compete with Amazon's Prime Now platform. Offline, formal retail format grocers originating from the city include FoodWorld supermarkets that started in 1996 and several other local brands.

Retail: Urban Ladder is a leading omnichannel commerce furniture retailer founded by entrepreneurs from the city. Lifestyle, now part of Dubai-based Landmark group originated as a brand in Bangalore in 1999. Tanishq is a jewelry retail store brand and is owned by the Tata Group. Printo is a chain of stationery and printing services stores.

Fintechs: Several fintechs have their origins in the city. The revolutionary low-cost brokerage firm Zerodha, several cryptocurrency exchanges. Pine Labs is a recent unicorn that builds POS systems. Capillary Technologies is a loyalty, analytics provider built over POS systems. QwikCilver, a gifting and loyalty platform founded in Bangalore was acquired by Amazon.

Beverages, Beer and Spirits: The city is known for its craft breweries, popular ones being Toit, Arbor Brewing Company and others. Kingfisher is one of the world's largest beer brands that originated in Bangalore. Amrut is India's first Single Malt Whisky brand that is sold all over the world and was named as the number three whisky in the world in 2010. United Breweries Group has its headquarters in Bangalore. It produces Kingfisher (beer).  

Biopharmaceuticals: Biocon is one of India's largest pharmaceutical companies which also owns a majority stake in India's largest Clinical Research Outsourcing (CRO) company Syngene International that works with global pharmaceutical majors. Strides Arcolab manufactures pharma products for emerging markets and is a listed entity in the Indian Stock Markets. The Himalaya Drug company makes several pharma and beauty care products and is headquartered in Bangalore. 

Consumer goods: Wildcraft, a fast-growing outdoor adventure goods company was founded in the city. Zivame is an online commerce lingerie company fast growing into the number 1 brand in India.

Healthcare: Narayana Hrudayalaya, a listed business, is a popular hospital chain that was built by renowned Bangalore cardiac surgeon. Portea Medical and Practo are some of the fast-growing startups in the space. Cloud Nine is a chain of fast-growing maternity and childcare brands founded in the city in 2007. 

Logistics: DTDC is an asset light logistics company built by first generation entrepreneurs in the city.

Feature Films: Lucia is a Kannada movie that is renowned as India's first crowdsourced movie. The movie was extensively shot in Bangalore. 

Fitness and Sports: There are many sports facility aggregators where consumers can book indoor courts or swimming pool slots like Playo. Many entrepreneurs are setting up sports facilities due to higher interest in fitness. There is a fitness chain called CureFit, invested in by early entrepreneurs and restaurants attached like EatFit.

Agriculture: Many wine yards are springing up around the city due to interest among a globally aware community of people residing in the city. Bangalore is also India's largest export of roses, about 70% of all rose exports come from the city.

Architecture: Samsung Electronics in 2018, opened Largest Mobile Experience Centre in the World at Bengaluru’s Iconic Opera House. Samsung Opera House will be a must-do destination for the city’s millennials looking for exciting tech-enabled experiences and entertainment. One will be able to enjoy VR experiences such as the 4D Sway Chair or the Whiplash Pulsar 4D chair that makes 360 degrees three-dimensional movements. One can slip into the role of a fighter pilot doing extreme aircraft stunts, or experience a space battle, or a roller coaster ride. The 33,000 sq ft standalone property, which during the British era hosted plays and Operas, has been restored over two years and its facade continues to don its magnificent original look and feel. On the inside, a modern experiential space has been developed with extensive use of modern technology.

Economic zones in the city 

There are several economic clusters, as in many cities in the world, in the city.

 Chickpete area is known for textile trades and early entrepreneurs in the city
Shivajinagar area houses auto spares and services clusters
 Whitefield was a neighboring town to Bangalore, but over time has been assimilated into the city. Whitefield houses several Information Technology Parks and many global firms have their India headquarters located in the area. 
 Koramangala and JP Nagar have traditionally been the area where tech startups take birth
Electronics City houses all the major IT service providers of India

Government incentives and programs 

Tax holiday for IT services: The Government of Karnataka was the first state government to introduce a tax holiday for IT service companies to set up shop in the city to earn a decade-long corporate tax holiday to incentivize the industry.

IT SEZ program: Server IT Special economic Zones are now set up where they receive a corporate tax holiday if offices are situated in those zones.

Ministry of IT: One of the early states in India to have a Ministerial position for Information Technology. This was created to address the issues faced by the industry in terms of physical and digital infrastructure, and supply of graduates.

Adoption of Technology in Government programs: Multiple government initiatives have included digitization of citizen programs and Karnataka has been at the forefront of adoption of technology. The Regional Transport Office in the city are fully computerized and they the earliest to do so. Bangalore also achieved full computerization of the Indian Passport Distribution process, first in the country.

The digital office of the Income Tax Department of India is based in Bangalore. The need for the build of systems to collect and refund taxes for millions of citizens and need for data analytics and AI to prevent fraud meant that Bangalore city was an obvious choice for the same.

See also
:Category:Companies based in Bangalore
Economy of Hyderabad

References

External links 

 Bangalore: India's Hightech-Capital
 Bangalore cluster: Evolution, growth and challenges - An examination of the IT industry in Bangalore
 The Garment Industry in Bangalore